Jerzy Werner (22 April 1909 Krosno, Galicia – 8 October 1977 Łódź) was a professor at the Technical University of Lodz, the constructor of the first Polish lorries, the Star 20 and Valentina, a builder of chassis for trucks at PZInż (National Industry Works) prior to World War II, and a Pawiak prisoner.

From 1962-1968, Werner was rector of the Technical University of Lodz; from 1965-1972, he was a Member of Parliament for the 4th and 5th terms of the Sejm of the Polish People’s Republic (as an independent politician).

Between world wars, Werner was a constructor of a truck chassis for the PZInż 703 and 713, which were much ahead of their time. He was also a constructor of the first Polish torque converter, and a creator of his own scientific school in the field of automotive engineering.

Decorations and Awards
 	Order of the Banner of Labour 2nd Class
 	Officer's Cross of the Order of Polonia Restituta
 	Order of Polonia Restituta
 	Medal of the 10th anniversary of Polish People's Republic
 	Medal of the National Education Commission
 	State Scientific Award of the second degree
 	The City of Łodz Award

Bibliography
 
 

1909 births
1977 deaths
People from Krosno
People from the Kingdom of Galicia and Lodomeria
Members of the Polish Sejm 1965–1969
Engineers from Łódź
Knights of the Order of Polonia Restituta
Officers of the Order of Polonia Restituta
Academic staff of Łódź University of Technology